Andrew Ure FRS (18 May 1778 – 2 January 1857) was a Scottish physician, chemist, scriptural geologist, and early business theorist who founded the Garnet Hill Observatory. He was a fellow of the Royal Astronomical Society and the Royal Society. Ure published a number of books based on his industrial consulting experiences.

Early life, education, and the army
Andrew Ure was born in Glasgow in May 1778 , the son of Anne and Alexander Ure, a cheesemonger. In 1801 he received an MD from the University of Glasgow, and served briefly as an army surgeon before re-settling in Glasgow in 1803.

Academic career
Ure became a member of the Faculty of Physicians and Surgeons after his return to Glasgow. He replaced Dr George Birkbeck as Professor of Natural Philosophy (specialising in chemistry and physics) in 1804 at the recently formed Andersonian Institution (now known as University of Strathclyde). His evening lectures in chemistry and mechanics enjoyed considerable success and inspired the foundation of the École des Arts et Métiers in Paris, and a number of mechanical institutions in Britain.

Ure founded the Garnet Hill Observatory in 1808. He and his wife resided in the observatory for several years. The observatory's reputation was second only to Greenwich's at that time. While in residence there, he was assisted by Sir William Herschel, who had come to the area to lecture at the local Astronomical Society. Herschel also took time to help him install a new  reflecting telescope (of Ure's design and manufacture). He was elected a Fellow of the Royal Astronomical Society in 1811.

In 1814, while giving guest lectures in Belfast, Ure consulted for the Irish linen board, and devised an 'alkalimeter' which gave volumetric estimates of the alkali contents of industrial substances. He was also well known in academia at the time for his practical chemistry knowledge and abilities.

On 4 November 1818 Ure assisted the Professor of Anatomy, James Jeffray, in experiments he had been carrying out on the body of a murderer named Matthew Clydesdale, after the man's execution by hanging. Jeffray claimed that, by stimulating the phrenic nerve, life could possibly be restored in cases of suffocation, drowning, or hanging.

Independent consultant and writer
In 1821 Ure published his first major book, Dictionary of Chemistry, a replacement for William Nicholson's outdated Dictionary. It came out two years after William Brande's Manual of Chemistry, and Ure was accused of plagiarism. Subsequently, Ure accused Dr William Henry and Thomas Thomson of plagiarism of his own works.

In 1822 he was elected a Fellow of the Royal Society. By 1830, Ure's outside interests led him to resign first from his chair and then from the institution. He moved to London and set himself up as a consulting chemist (probably the first such in Britain). His work included acting as an expert witness, taking on government commissions, and making industrial tours of England, Belgium, and France. His visits to English textile mills led to his 1835 publication of The Philosophy of Manufactures; followed by An Account of the Cotton Industry in 1836; both dealing with the textile industry conditions. In 1840 he helped found the Pharmaceutical Society of Great Britain.

His exposure to factory conditions led him to consider methods of heating and ventilation for workers, and he is credited with being the first to describe a bi-metallic thermostat.

The great Dictionary of Arts, Manufactures and Mines, Ure's chief and most encyclopaedic work, was published in 1837. Enlarged editions were rapidly called for in 1840, 1843, and 1853. After his death, four further editions appeared—the last in 1878. This work was translated into almost every European language, including Russian and Spanish. The Times review said: "This is a book of vast research, and the variety of subjects embraced in it may be estimated by the fact that on the French translation it was thought advisable to employ nineteen collaborators, all regarded as experts in their special subjects." Historical accounts of the advancement of geology regularly make mention of Andrew Ure.

Geology
Ure was a scriptural geologist and in 1829 published A New System of Geology and was elected an original member of the Geological Society of London . Ure promoted the study of geology, that "...magnificent field of knowledge." However some criticised the book severely, and "The New System of Geology was not a success, even among readers who might have been expected to be sympathetic, and it was soon forgotten." because "the New System of Geology ... came just too late, at a time when the positions it so noisily defended were being quietly abandoned, leaving the author in slightly ridiculous isolation." Lyell's claimed, falsely, that Ure wanted all promoters of the new geology "...to be burnt at Smithfield." Ure thought both Werner's and Hutton's theories violated every principle of mechanical and chemical science.  A sound geological theory, he believed, ought to follow Bacon and Newton's example.  And since geology and the Scriptures were the work of God then they would agree when properly interpreted. Ure said that the Bible was important to the history of the earth. He distinguished between the present functioning of the universe and its origin in the past. For him, the proper science is the repeatable and experimental study of how creation functions in the present. But concerning the unobservable past, we create speculation.

Personal life and death

He married Catherine [ Monteath] Ure in 1807.  By 1819 she had become the mistress of an Anderson's Institution colleague, and they divorced.

Ure died in 1857 in London. Throughout his life he had a wide circle of friends and he communicated regularly with many principal scientists around the world. These all lamented his death. Michael Faraday's posthumous description of him was:

He is buried in the Terrace Catacombs of Highgate Cemetery. A secondary memorial was erected in Glasgow Cathedral by his daughter, Katherine MacKinlay.

Selected works
 A Dictionary of Chemistry
 A New System of Geology
 The Philosophy of Manufactures: or, An Exposition of the Scientific, Moral, and Commercial Economy of the Factory System of Great Britain
 The Cotton Manufacture of Great Britain
 Dictionary of Arts, Manufactures and Mines
 An Account of the Cotton Industry

Notes

References

Sources

External links

 
 
 Andrew Ure article at Schoolnet
 Prof. Andrew Ure article at The Gazetteer for Scotland

1778 births
1857 deaths
19th-century Scottish medical doctors
Scottish astronomers
Scottish business theorists
Scottish chemists
Scottish scholars and academics
Scottish non-fiction writers
Scientists from Glasgow
Academics of the University of Strathclyde
Alumni of the University of Glasgow
Fellows of the Royal Society
Fellows of the Royal College of Physicians and Surgeons of Glasgow
Fellows of the Royal Astronomical Society
Burials at Highgate Cemetery
Medical doctors from Glasgow